Valerie Tripp (born 1951) is a children's book author, best known for her work with the American Girl book series.
 
She grew up in Mount Kisco, New York, with three sisters and a brother.
She graduated from Yale University and has a Master of Education degree from Harvard University. Since 1985 she has lived in Silver Spring, Maryland. Her husband teaches history at Montgomery College. She has been a writer for reading textbooks for three decades.

Tripp is best known for her work with the American Girl series.  She wrote all the books in the Felicity, Josefina, Kit, Molly and Maryellen series, and three of the books in the Samantha series. She has also written four of the five "Best Friends" character stories to date. Film dramatizations of the lives of Samantha, Felicity, Molly, Maryellen and Kit have been based on her stories to varying extents.

Selected works
 Classic Adventures: The Adventures of Sherlock Holmes [illustrated by Carlo Molinari], Starry Forest Books, February 2021
 Deluxe Greek Myths: Goddesses and Gardens [illustrated by Teresa Martinez], Starry Forest Books, July 2021
 Classic Adventures: The Adventures of Tom Sawyer [illustrated by Rosalia Radosti], Starry Forest Books, September 2021

References

External links
Valerie Tripp Personal Website
Valerie Tripp at American Girl Publishing
Biography
Amazing Kids Interview 
List of Novels by Valerie Tripp

American children's writers
Harvard Graduate School of Education alumni
Living people
1951 births
20th-century American women writers
20th-century American writers
Yale University alumni
21st-century American women